Vandeput is a surname. Notable people with the surname include:

George Vandeput (died 1800), English Royal Navy admiral
Steven Vandeput (born 1967), Belgian politician
Virgile Vandeput (born 1994), Belgian-born alpine skier who competes for Israel

See also
Vandeput baronets, extinct English baronetcy